The following is the discography of Serj Tankian, an Armenian-American singer and musician. He is best known as the lead vocalist, songwriter, keyboardist, and occasionally rhythm guitarist of the Grammy Award-winning rock band System of a Down.

This discography consists of five studio albums, one collaboration album, four EPs, two live album/DVD, thirty-three singles, twenty-three music videos, and all other known appearances by Tankian on other artists' albums, soundtracks, and in video games. This article also contains the production credits by Tankian. The list does not include anything performed or recorded with System of a Down. To see recordings by System of a Down, see System of a Down discography.

Albums

Studio albums

Live albums

Collaborative albums

Soundtracks
 Prometheus Bound (2011)
 The Last Inhabitant (2016)
 1915 (2016)
 Intent to Destroy (2017)
 Furious (2017)
 Spitak (2018)
 Midnight Star (2019)
 Truth to Power (2021)
 I Am Not Alone (2021)
 Madoff: The Monster of Wall Street (2023)

EPs

Singles

As lead artist

Promotional singles

As featured artist

Music videos

Other appearances

Production discography
Tankian has also produced a number of albums.

References

Rock music discographies
Discographies of American artists
Discographie